Supreme Rock was an Irish Sport Horse, bred by Lindy Nixon-Gray Ireland & ridden by Pippa Funnell in four event competitions for Great Britain. He was put down in early April 2013 aged 25.  He was a  bay gelding. He was retired in 2005 at the Badminton Horse Trials. He is remembered primarily for his role in Funnell's completion of the Grand Slam of Eventing, winning the Badminton Horse Trials, the Rolex Kentucky Three Day and The Land Rover Burghley Horse Trials. He is also the only horse ever to have won two European Championship titles back-to-back – Luhmühlen (Germany) in 1999, and Pau (France) in 2001 – as well as being one of a select group of horses to have won Badminton Horse Trials twice in 2002 and 2003. The high point of his career with Funnell was winning team Silver at the 2000 Olympics in Sydney.

Pedigree

References

Eventing horses
Horses in the Olympics
1988 animal births
2013 animal deaths
Irish Sport Horses